Poland competed at the 1988 Winter Olympics in Calgary, Alberta, Canada.

Competitors
The following is the list of number of competitors in the Games.

Alpine skiing

Figure skating

Ice hockey

Group A
Top three teams (shaded ones) entered the medal round.

Canada 1-0 Poland
Sweden 1-1 Poland
Poland 6-2 France*
Switzerland 4-1 Poland
Finland 5-1 Poland

* The Polish team was stripped of its victory after Jarosław Morawiecki tested positive for testosterone. France was recorded as having a 2-nil win, but received no points in the standings.

Game for 9th place

|}

Nordic combined 

Events:
 normal hill ski jumping (Best two out of three jumps.)
 15 km cross-country skiing (Start delay, based on ski jumping results.)

Ski jumping

Speed skating

Men

Women

References

Official Olympic Reports
 Olympic Winter Games 1988, full results by sports-reference.com

Nations at the 1988 Winter Olympics
1988
1988 in Polish sport